{{Speciesbox
 | name = 
 | image = Lasiopetalum rosmarinifolium.jpg
 | image_caption = Near Lake King
 | status = 
 | status_system = 
 | genus = Lasiopetalum
 | species = rosmarinifolium
 | authority = (Turcz.) Benth.
 |synonyms_ref = 
 |synonyms = 
 Lasiopetalum leucogriseum E.M.Benn. MS 
 Lasiopetalum rosmarinifolium var. latifolia Benth. orth. var.
 Lasiopetalum rosmarinifolium var. latifolium (Turcz.) Benth. 
 Lasiopetalum rosmarinifolium (Turcz.) Benth. var. rosmarinifolium 
 Lasiopetalum sp. Kukerin (C.A.Gardner 13646) WA Herbarium 
 Sarotes latifolia Turcz. 
 Sarotes rosmarinifolia Turcz.
}}Lasiopetalum rosmarinifolium is a species of flowering plant in the family Malvaceae and is endemic to the south-west of Western Australia. It is an erect or spreading shrub with hairy stems and leaves, linear leaves and white flowers.

Flowering occurs from June to November.

Taxonomy
This species was first formally described in 1852 by Nikolai Turczaninow who gave it the name Sorotes rosmarinifolia in Bulletin de la Société Impériale des Naturalistes de Moscou from specimens collected by James Drummond. In 1863, George Bentham changed the name to Lasiopetalum rosmarinifolium in Flora Australiensis.
The specific epithet (rosmarinifolium) means "rosemary-leaved".

Distribution and habitat
This lasiopetalum grows in sandy and gravelly soils in the Avon Wheatbelt, Esperance Plains, Hampton and Mallee biogeographic regions of south-western Western Australia.

Conservation statusLasiopetalum rosmarinifolium'' is listed as "not threatened" by the Western Australian Government Department of Biodiversity, Conservation and Attractions.

References

rosmarinifolium
Malvales of Australia
Flora of Western Australia
Plants described in 1852
Taxa named by Nikolai Turczaninow